The chapters of the seinen manga series xxxHolic are written and illustrated by Clamp, a group of four manga artists. They have been serialized by Kodansha since 2003 and ended in February 2011. The series, which ties in strongly with another of Clamp's series, Tsubasa: Reservoir Chronicle, revolves around Kimihiro Watanuki, a high-school student plagued by spirits who is employed by Yūko Ichihara at her wish-granting shop.

Its serialization in the journal Young Magazine was interrupted in March 2010 and continued on Kodansha's Bessatsu Shōnen Magazine in June 2010. A one-shot chapter of xxxHolic was also published in Weekly Shōnen Magazine in its June 2010 issue featuring a crossover with Clamp's manga Tsubasa: Reservoir Chronicle. The 213 chapters are collected and released in tankōbon format by Kodansha. The numbers of chapters for such release was reduced by combining the ones from the original serialization. Starting volume 16, the series is retitled , but the number of chapters follow the previous ones. Production I.G adapted the manga into an animated film, which was followed by two anime television series and various original video animations.

A total of nineteen volumes were released from July 25, 2003, to March 9, 2011. xxxHolic was one of the first four manga series licensed for English release in North America by Del Rey Manga, and was acquired together with Mobile Suit Gundam SEED, Negima!: Magister Negi Magi, and Tsubasa: Reservoir Chronicle in January 2004. Del Rey does not include chapter lists in this series anymore as they were mixed up in early translations of the series. Del Rey published its first volume on April 27, 2004, and as of March 9, 2012, all nineteen volumes were released. The series has also been licensed for an English-language release by Tanoshimi, who released the first nine volumes in the United Kingdom with the first one on August 3, 2006.

A new xxxHolic manga titled  was announced at The CLAMP Festival 2012 event. It started serialization in Kodansha's Young Magazine in March 2013.



Volume list

xxxHolic

xxxHolic Rei

 
 
 

Chapters 53-56 have not been published as a volume. The Zashiki-warashi story was not completed at the end of Chapter 56.

References

XxxHolic
XxxHolic